The Among Us chicken nugget is a Chicken McNugget obtained from the 2021 BTS Meal by McDonald's. It was listed for online auction on eBay in May 2021 for its resemblance to the crewmate characters from the 2018 game Among Us. Media outlets commented on the seemingly absurd price of the listing, and it spurred several conspiracy theorists to promote misinformation claiming that the auction was a front for child sex trafficking. It was recognized by Guinness World Records in 2023 as the "most expensive chicken nugget sold at online auction".

Background 
Released in 2018, Innersloth's Among Us—a social deduction game featuring miniature characters known as "crewmates"—saw a large increase in popularity in 2020 during the COVID-19 pandemic. On May 26, 2021, McDonald's launched the BTS Meal in a collaboration with South Korean K-pop band BTS, which contained several Chicken McNuggets.

Listing and bids 
On May 28, 2021, an American seller named Tav, better known as polizna, listed a McNugget obtained from the BTS Meal for online auction on eBay.

Reception and legacy 
Several news outlets covered the auction, who largely cited it as an example of an absurd price caused by internet memes, and IGN called the sale price "proof" that "2021 is a very weird time to be alive". Following the sale, multiple other listings selling nuggets of a similar shape were made in hopes of profiting from the popularity of the original listing. Several TikTokers and QAnon-adjacent conspiracy theorists promoted misinformation and rumors claiming that the high price of the listing was a front for child sex trafficking, which Rolling Stone described as "clearly ridiculous on its face". In 2022, the listing was recognized by Guinness World Records as the "most expensive chicken nugget sold at online auction". Chilean chicken brand Super Pollo partnered with Innersloth in October 2022 to launch a crewmate-shaped chicken nugget into the Earth's thermosphere.

See also 

 Unusual eBay listings
 Pareidolia

References

External links 

 Original listing on eBay, archived at the Wayback Machine

2020s in Internet culture
Internet memes introduced in 2021
EBay listings